Voronezhsky (masculine), Voronezhskaya (feminine), or Voronezhskoye (neuter) is the name of several rural localities in Russia.

Modern localities
Voronezhsky, Irkutsk Oblast, a settlement in Kirensky District of Irkutsk Oblast
Voronezhsky, Krasnodar Krai, a khutor in Trekhselsky Rural Okrug of Uspensky District in Krasnodar Krai; 
Voronezhskoye, a selo in Ivanovsky Selsoviet of Kochubeyevsky District in Stavropol Krai
Voronezhskaya (rural locality), a stanitsa in Voronezhsky Rural Okrug of Ust-Labinsky District in Krasnodar Krai;

Alternative names
Voronezhsky, alternative name of Voronezh, a settlement in Karamyshevsky Selsoviet of Zmeinogorsky District in Altai Krai;

Historical localities
Voronezhsky (pogost), a rural locality which existed at some point in Kolsko-Loparskaya Volost

See also
sovkhoza Voronezhsky, a settlement in Voronezh Oblast
Voronezhskoye-1, a selo in Khabarovsk Krai
Voronezhskoye-2, a selo in Khabarovsk Krai
Voronezhskoye-3, a selo in Khabarovsk Krai